William Barr (26 April 186725 February 1933, Glasgow, Scotland) began his art studies as a student at the Paisley School of Art and Design where he earned art teachers and art masters certificates. He went on to the Glasgow School of Art (1895–98), South Kensington School of Art in London and Académie Julian in Paris (1904). He taught at the Paisley School of Art for ten years before moving to San Francisco, California, in 1915 to make a living as an artist painting the landscapes of California along with portraits and genre scenes. He painted mainly en plein air landscapes of California until his death on 25 February 1933.

He was married to Elizabeth Stevenson Smith and had two children, Margaret and Ann.

References

External links
William Barr-Artist, additional biographic information with examples of paintings

Académie Julian alumni
Painters from California
1867 births
1933 deaths
19th-century Scottish painters
Scottish male painters
20th-century Scottish painters
20th-century American painters
American male painters
Artists from Glasgow
Alumni of the Glasgow School of Art
Artists from San Francisco
20th-century American male artists
19th-century Scottish male artists
20th-century Scottish male artists